The Alfred and Olive Thorpe Lustron House is a historic Lustron house built in 1950, located at 1001 Northeast 2nd Street in Fort Lauderdale, Florida.

Description and history 
Its original occupants were Alfred and Olive Thorpe, who purchased it apparently from a Lustron Corporation distributor, the Craftsman Home Corporation, in 1951. On November 1, 2007, it was added to the National Register of Historic Places.

It is a two-bedroom "Westchester Deluxe Model 2" example.

References

External links

Houses on the National Register of Historic Places in Florida
National Register of Historic Places in Broward County, Florida
Houses in Fort Lauderdale, Florida
Houses completed in 1950
Lustron houses
1950 establishments in Florida